The Baranovichi offensive was a battle fought on the Eastern Front during World War I between an army of Russia and the forces of Germany and Austria-Hungary in July 1916.

Background
Concurrent to an attack by Russian Southwestern Front, the Russian Western Front was to launch an offensive in the direction of Vilna. However, the plan of attack was changed - instead of an attack on Vilna, the offensive was to target the area of Baranovichi. This change of direction came about due to orders from above, mediated in a vision to Grigory Rasputin, and accepted by the Tsar, as commander-in-chief. In early June 1916, the troops of the Southwestern Front began their offensive, achieving breakthroughs against the Austro-Hungarian army and advancing into Galicia. However, General A. E. Evert, commander of the Russian Western Front, twice postponed planned offensive towards Baranovichi, first on 31 May, then on 4 June, and then attempted to cancel the operation altogether. By order of Russian GHQ, General Evert was obliged to " attack the enemy on the front - Nowogrodek - Baranovichi" on 3 June.

Battle
The Russian Fourth Army launched the first attack on 2 July with three army corps, but had stalled by the next day. The Russians revived the offensive on 4 July but again stalled after only two days of fighting. Under the cover of night on 8 July, the Russians launched a third push but all Russian attacks were repulsed by the end of the following day. On 14 July the German Army counterattacked and took back all lost ground. A final Russian attempt was made from 25 to 29 July, but yet again failed.

Results
Despite months of preparation and a sixfold advantage in manpower and artillery, the Russians failed to break through the fortified German positions, seizing only the first fortified line in some areas of the offensive which was then lost to German counterattacks.

Literature
 John Keegan: Der erste Weltkrieg. Eine europaische Tragodie. Rowohlt-Taschenbuch-Verlag, Reinbek bei Hamburg 2001, 
 Norman Stone: The Eastern Front 1914–1917. Penguin Books Ltd., London 1998, 
 Christian Zentner: Der erste Weltkrieg. Daten, Fakten, Kommentare. Moewig, Rastatt 2000,

References

Conflicts in 1916
Battles of the Eastern Front (World War I)
Battles of World War I involving Germany
Battles of World War I involving Russia
Military history of Belarus
1916 in the Russian Empire
1910s in Belarus
Minsk Governorate
July 1916 events